Abubeker Nassir Ahmed (born 23 February 2000) is an Ethiopian professional footballer who plays as a forward for Mamelodi Sundowns in the Premier Soccer League and the Ethiopia national team. He previously played for Ethiopian Coffee S.C. in the Ethiopian Premier League.

Club career
Nassir left his first club Harar City in 2016 (2009 E.C.) to join perennial powerhouse Ethiopian Coffee. Nassir initially played with the club's B team before quickly working his way into the senior team. In 2020, Nassir signed a contract extension with Ethiopian Coffee that would keep him at the club until 2025.

In 2021 Kaizer Chiefs and Mamelodi Sundowns of the DStv Premiership have reportedly stepped up the chase for Ethiopian wonderkid Abubeker Nassir. Furthermore, both Chiefs and Sundowns are not the only teams interested in Nassir as clubs from Algeria and Egypt are also keeping an eye on him. According to KickOff, Coffee have already turned down offers from Tanzanian outfit AZAM after they had tabled concrete offers for the striker. The publication reports that Nassir also has offers in Georgia and in lower divisions of Spanish football.

International career

International goals 
Scores and results list Ethiopia's goal tally first.

References

External links
 

Living people
2000 births
Ethiopian footballers
Ethiopia international footballers
Association football forwards
Ethiopian Coffee S.C. players
Mamelodi Sundowns F.C. players
Ethiopian Premier League players
2021 Africa Cup of Nations players
South African Premier Division players
Ethiopian expatriate footballers
Ethiopian expatriate sportspeople in South Africa
Expatriate soccer players in South Africa